Acraea pelopeia is a butterfly in the family Nymphalidae. It is found from Cameroon to the eastern part of the Democratic Republic of the Congo and in the Central African Republic.

Description

Male. Wingspan 68 mm. Forewing sepia black. Cell, basal portions of 6, 5, 4, 3, 2, and nearly all lb, rather thinly scaled and partially transparent. A slight submarginal powdering of whitish scales in lb. Hindwing with a dark sepia-grey basal suffusion extending slightly beyond origin of nervule 2, and outwardly approximately determined by a line drawn from middle of costa to middle of inner margin. Discal area deep orange red (probably rosy red when alive), A well-defined brown-black hind-marginal border about 2 mm. wide, its inner edge slightly edentate (lacking teeth) on the nervules. Black spots as beneath, but obscured by basal suffusion. Underside. Costa, apical area and hind margin dusky ochreous, striated by the nervules and rays which are broadly powdered with dark brown. The ochreous marginal border gradually obscured towards the hind angle by a sepia-brown suffusion. A black spot at base of costa, and some black at base of area 1b.

Hindwing Basal area and hind margin greenish ochreous, central area ochreous. The brown nervures towards the margin heavily dusted with dark brown, the dusting being widest before it reaches the margin, thus giving the nervules a swollen appearance. Between them the internervular rays, though more slender, are similarly indicated. Unlike peneleos these rays extend to the bases of the internervular areas. A series of black spots, most of which are rather large. In area 7, two, much closer together than in peneleos. Beneath the outer spot a smaller one more distally placed in area 6, and beneath this a dot in 5. On the upper part of discocellulars a spot of variable size, sometimes continent with another just beneath it. In cell two or three spots, the second over origin of nervule 2, and the third, when present, very small. Sometimes a spot at base of area 3. A spot in 2 near its base, followed by one in 1c and in lb, nearly in a straight line. A basal and a subbasal in 1c. Beneath the latter a spot in lb, and more proximally placed a spot in la. A spot in 9 and in 8.

Head black with a pale dot between eyes, two pale tufts on collar. Thorax black above with two pale spots. Abdomen black above with yellowish lateral spots. Claws unequal. The female was not described.

The late Dr. Otto Staudinger in his 1896 paper in Iris, gave a description of this species. This description is somewhat involved, and consists largely of a comparison of penelope, peneleos, parrhasia, and the present form. He concludes by saying that, should it be found through the acquisition of further material to be a distinct species, he proposes for it the name pelopeia. After having seen the insect described,

Taxonomy
It is a member of the Acraea circeis species group - but see also Pierre & Bernaud, 2014

References

External links

Acraea pelopeia  Le Site des Acraea de Dominique Bernaud
Images representing Acraea pelopeia at Bold.

Butterflies described in 1896
pelopeia
Butterflies of Africa
Taxa named by Otto Staudinger